The Bolton River is a river near the community of Iron Bridge in Huron Shores, Algoma District, Ontario, Canada.

See also
List of rivers of Ontario

References

Rivers of Algoma District